The 2020 Stony Brook Seawolves football team represented Stony Brook University in the 2020–21 NCAA Division I FCS football season. They were led by Chuck Priore in his 15th season as head coach and played their home games at Kenneth P. LaValle Stadium in Stony Brook, New York. The Seawolves competed as a member of the Colonial Athletic Association.

On July 17, 2020, the Colonial Athletic Association announced that it would not play fall sports due to the COVID-19 pandemic. However, the conference is allowing the option for teams to play as independents for the 2020 season if they still wish to play in the fall.

Three players from the 2020 Stony Brook team signed undrafted free agent contracts after the 2021 NFL Draft. Safety Augie Contressa signed with the Tampa Bay Buccaneers, defensive tackle Sam Kamara signed with the Chicago Bears and defensive back TJ Morrison signed with the Las Vegas Raiders.

Previous season

The Seawolves finished the 2019 season 5–7, 2–6 in CAA play to finish in 11th place.

Schedule
Stony Brook had a game scheduled against Fordham on August 29, which was later canceled before the start of the 2020 season. This game was replaced with a game against FBS Western Michigan, which would have paid Stony Brook $325,000. Stony Brook was also originally scheduled to play FBS Florida Atlantic, which would have paid Stony Brook $400,000. Stony Brook's home opener was originally scheduled for September 26 against Sacred Heart. All games on the original 11-game schedule were canceled on July 17, 2020.

The CAA released its spring conference schedule on October 27, 2020.

References

Stony Brook
Stony Brook Seawolves football seasons
Stony Brook Seawolves football